Richard Perkins may refer to:

Richard Perkins (actor) (c. 1585–1650), English actor
Richard Perkins (scientist), United States nuclear physicist
Richard Perkins (figure skater), Canadian Olympic ice dancer
Richard Perkins (politician) (born 1961), Nevada State Assembly leader
Richard Perkins of Ufton, a member of the Perkins family of Ufton, Berkshire, England

See also
Rick Perkins, Canadian politician
Richard Scott Perkin (1906–1969), American entrepreneur
Richard Perkyn (fl. 1335), English politician